The Maxtra 125 is a race motorcycle manufactured by Haojue to race in the Grand Prix motorcycle World Championship.

The engine design is innovative for a 125cc racing bike: the cylinder points downwards, rendering several possibilities in the intake system and in weight distribution. Also, Haojue will try to improve the 125 by developing aerodynamics of the bodywork.

2009 specifications
Engine
Two-stroke single-cylinder liquid cooled
Bore & Stroke: 54 X 54.5mm
Displacement: 124.8cc
Induction: Reed valve
Carburettor: 38mm
Compression Ratio: 15:1
Ignition: DCI-CDI with battery
Transmission: Six-speed cassette-type gearbox
Clutch: Dry multiplate

Chassis
Wheelbase: 1,235mm
Fork angle: 23 degrees
Trail: 92mm
Front Suspension: Öhlins GP125 gas pressurised
Rear Suspension: Öhlins TTX36
Brakes: Brembo – twin 220mm floating discs front, twin-piston monobloc callipers
Wheels: PVM
Tyres: Dunlop
Chain: Regina

References
Maxtra official website

Grand Prix motorcycles